Valley Vista High School may refer to:

 Valley Vista High School (Arizona), Surprise, Arizona
 Valley Vista High School (California), Fountain Valley, California